The Battle of Aegina was a sea battle that took place in 458 BCE between Aegina, aided by the Peloponnesian League, and Athens, as part of the Third Messenian War.  Athens captured 70 ships and landed, laying siege to the city-state.  The siege was successful after a little more than two years.  Subsequently Aegina paid tribute to Athens.

See also
 Battle of Tanagra (457 BC)

References

Aegina
Aegina
Ancient Aegina